Franklin Bay is a large inlet in the Northwest Territories, Canada. It is a southern arm of the Amundsen Gulf, southeastern Beaufort Sea. The Parry Peninsula is to the east, and its southern area is called Langton Bay.  

Franklin Bay receives the Horton River. There are gales in the early winter months.

Franklin Bay was named in honor of Arctic explorer Sir John Franklin by John Richardson in 1826.

History
Based on hearsay rather than exploration, Émile Petitot, a French Missionary Oblate and a notable Canadian northwest cartographer, ethnologist, and geographer charted the Hornaday River's mouth at Franklin Bay, instead of Darnley Bay in his flawed 1875 maps and account.

Langton Bay was the base of operations for the three-year expedition, 1909 to 1912, of Arctic explorers Vilhjalmur Stefansson and Rudolph Anderson

References

Bays of the Northwest Territories